Edmund 'Garryowen' Finn (13 January 1819 – 4 April 1898) was an Australian journalist and author who wrote many colorful descriptions of the life and people in early Melbourne.

Finn was born in Tipperary, Ireland, the son of William Finn and his wife Catherine, née Mason. He was educated for the priesthood at Galbally Abbey, near Limerick.

Finn arrived in Melbourne on 19 July 1841 and was employed as a tutor of the classics. In 1845 Finn joined the staff of the Port Phillip Herald under editor George Cavenagh. He worked on The Herald for thirteen years. In 1858 the chief secretary, John O'Shanassy, who had been at school with Finn, appointed him clerk of the papers of the Victorian Legislative Council, a position from which he retired on a pension in 1886 due to failing eyesight.

In 1878 he published Der Eggsberiences ov Hans Schwarts … with Humorous Interleaves. The Garryowen Sketches … 'by an old Colonist'   were reprinted as a book in 1880. The Chronicles of Early Melbourne 1835 to 1852 by Garryowen, in two volumes, were published in 1888.

Finn married twice. A son, Edmund, published A Priest's Secret (Melbourne, 1888) and other works.

Further reading

References
'Finn, Edmund {Garryowen} (1819–1898)', Australian Dictionary of Biography, Volume 1, MUP, 1966, p. 376. Retrieved on 19 October 2008

1819 births
1898 deaths
Australian people of Irish descent
19th-century Australian journalists
19th-century Australian male writers
19th-century male writers
Settlers of Melbourne
Australian male journalists